Särkkä is a Finnish surname. Notable people with the surname include:

 Wille Särkkä (1877–1968), Finnish farmer and politician
 Toivo Särkkä (1890–1975), Finnish film producer and director
 Tony Särkkä (1972–2017), Swedish multi-instrumentalist

Finnish-language surnames